Mamaliha is a village in Dnistrovskyi Raion, Chernivtsi Oblast, Ukraine. It hosts the administration of Mamalyha rural hromada, one of the hromadas of Ukraine.

Until 18 July 2020, Mamalyha belonged to Novoselytsia Raion. The raion was abolished in July 2020 as part of the administrative reform of Ukraine, which reduced the number of raions of Chernivtsi Oblast to three. The area of Novoselytsia Raion was split between Chernivtsi Raion and Dnistrovskyi Raions, with Mamalyha being transferred to Dnistrovskyi Raion.

Mamalyha is a border crossing point to Criva, Moldova.

References

Villages in Dnistrovskyi Raion
Moldova–Ukraine border crossings
Moldova–Ukraine border
Khotinsky Uyezd
Populated places on the Prut